Teenage Mutant Ninja Turtles Guide to the Universe is the second supplement for the Teenage Mutant Ninja Turtles & Other Strangeness role-playing game. It was published by Palladium Books in May 1987 and uses the Palladium Megaversal system.

Publication history
The Teenage Mutant Ninja Turtles Guide to the Universe was written by Erick Wujcik, with art by Kevin Eastman and Peter Laird, and was published by Palladium Books in 1987 as a 48-page book.

Contents
The Teenage Mutant Ninja Turtles Guide to the Universe is a supplement covering the Turtles' outer-space milieu, with rules for vehicle creation (covering all forms of aircraft), air and space combat, descriptions of enemy aliens and robots, descriptions of alien space realms (including the Human Federation), plus three miniscenarios and a comics story.

Setting 
The Guide to the Universe introduces game setting information related to space travel and many alien races, such as the Utroms and Triceratons. Several science fiction adventure scenarios are included, as well as extensive technology and vehicle creation rules. It can be fit into any timeline of the TMNT universe.

References

1987 books
Teenage Mutant Ninja Turtles & Other Strangeness